Tvrdošín District (okres Tvrdošín) is a district in
the Žilina Region of central Slovakia. The district was first established in 1996; in 1923 it had been a part of Trstená District.

Municipalities 
Brezovica
Čimhová
Habovka
Hladovka
Liesek
Nižná
Oravský Biely Potok
Podbiel
Suchá Hora
Štefanov nad Oravou
Trstená
Tvrdošín
Vitanová
Zábiedovo
Zuberec

External links 
Official site

Districts of Slovakia
Žilina Region